Bolgar may refer to:

People 
Bolgars, a people of Central Asian origin
Bolgar language, the extinct language of the Bulgars
Bolgar languages
Bolgar Bagryanov, Bulgarian film director
Boyan Bolgar, Bulgarian writer
Hedda Bolgar (1909–2013), American psychoanalyst
J. Bolgar, student of British mathematician Dan Segal
Peter Bolgar (b. 1936), British television and radio announcer
Robert Bolgar (1913–1985), an Austro-Hungarian-British classical scholar 
William A. Bolgar, a Ford Hall Forum speaker in 1929
Dániel Bolgár (b. 1982), Hungarian musician
Elek Bolgár, ambassador of the People's Republic of Hungary to the United Kingdom, envoy extraordinary
Tamás Bolgár, Hungarian voivode, King of the Gypsies

Fictional character 
Bolgar, a character in the 2007 Flash Gordon series who replaced Prince Thun

Places 
Bolgar Urban Settlement, a municipal formation which the town of Bolgar and one rural locality in Spassky District of the Republic of Tatarstan, Russia are incorporated as
Bolgar (inhabited locality), several inhabited localities in Russia
Bolgar Buttress, a buttress in Antarctica
Bolghar, a historical Volga Bulgarian capital

Other uses 
KZT BOLGAR, a Bulgarian tractor manufacturer

See also
Bulgar (disambiguation)
Volgar (disambiguation)
Vulgar (disambiguation)
Bolgary, several rural localities in Russia